Natalie MacMaster  (born June 13, 1972) is a Canadian fiddler from Troy, Inverness County, Nova Scotia who plays Cape Breton fiddle music. MacMaster has toured with the Chieftains, Faith Hill, Carlos Santana, and Alison Krauss, and has recorded with Yo-Yo Ma. She has appeared at the Celtic Colours festival in Cape Breton, Celtic Connections in Scotland, and MerleFest in the United States.

Background

MacMaster is the daughter of Alex and Minnie (née Beaton) MacMaster and the sister of Kevin and David MacMaster. She is the niece of the late renowned Cape Breton fiddler Buddy MacMaster and the cousin of two other fiddlers, Ashley MacIsaac and Andrea Beaton. She is also distantly related to Jack White.

In 2002, she married fiddler Donnell Leahy of the Leahy family band, and moved to Lakefield, Ontario. Leahy and MacMaster have seven children, and have performed and recorded together as a duo, and occasionally include their children, who also play fiddle, in their performances.

Musical career
MacMaster began playing the fiddle at the age of nine, and made her performing debut the same year at a square dance in Glencoe Mills, Nova Scotia. When she was sixteen she released her first album, Four on the Floor, and a second album, Road to the Isle, followed in 1991. Her first album was self-produced, while her second was co-produced by John Morris Rankin (The Rankin Family) and Tom O'Keefe (as per original cassette jacket). Both albums were initially released only on cassette, but Rounder Records omitted a few tracks and re-released as A Compilation in 1998. In 1999, she performed at the Juno Awards show in Hamilton.

In recent years she has expanded her musical repertoire, mixing her Cape Breton roots with music from Scotland and Ireland, as well as American bluegrass.

In 2004, MacMaster appeared on Sharon, Lois & Bram's 25th Anniversary Concert special titled "25 Years of Skinnamarink" that aired on CBC on January 1, 2004 at 7:00pm. She performed two songs with the trio: "C-H-I-C-K-E-N" and "Grandpa's Farm".

Awards
She has received a number of Canadian music awards, including several "Artist of the Year" awards from the East Coast Music Association, two Juno Awards for best instrumental album, and "Fiddler of the Year" from the Canadian Country Music Association. MacMaster was also awarded an honorary doctorate from Niagara University in New York in 2006. In 2006, she was made a member of the Order of Canada, and in 2020, she was made a member of the Order of Nova Scotia.

Discography

Albums

Singles

Music videos

Other appearances

 Traditional Music From Cape Breton Island, Nimbus NI5383, 1993 (two tracks)
 Celtic Colours – The Road Home, 1997 (one track)
 Celtic Colours – The Second Wave, 1998 (one track)
 Celtic Colours – Forgotten Roots, 1999 (one track)
 Roots Music: An American Journey, Rounder 0501, 2001 (one track)
 Songs for the Savoy, 2001 (one track)
 Celtic Colours — The Colours of Cape Breton, 2002 (one track)
 Celtic Colours — Volume VII, 2003 (one track)
 The Rough Guide to the Music of Canada, 2005 (one track)
 Yo-Yo Ma & Friends: Songs of Joy and Peace; Songs:A Christmas Jig/Mouth of the Tobique Reel; 2008 (Sony BMG)
 Thomas Dolby: Amerikana EP, Songs:Toad Lickers and 17 Hills'', 2010 (Lost Toy People, Inc)

References

External links
 
 
 "Cape Breton fiddling in reel time" (TED2002)
 "Fiddling in reel time" (TED2003)
 

1972 births
Living people
20th-century Canadian violinists and fiddlers
20th-century Canadian women singers
20th-century women pianists
21st-century Canadian violinists and fiddlers
21st-century Canadian women singers
21st-century women pianists
Canadian female dancers
Canadian Folk Music Award winners
Canadian folk singers
Canadian folk violinists
Canadian people of Scottish descent
Canadian women folk singers
Canadian women pianists
Canadian women violinists and fiddlers
Cape Breton fiddlers
Juno Award for Instrumental Album of the Year winners
Members of the Order of Canada
Members of the Order of Nova Scotia
Musicians from Nova Scotia
Nova Scotia Teachers College alumni
People from Cape Breton Island
People from Inverness County, Nova Scotia
Rounder Records artists